Martin Evald John Krygier , (born 1949) is an Australian academic.

Education
Krygier obtained BA and LLB degrees at the University of Sydney and a PhD in the History of Ideas at the Australian National University.

Career
Krygier taught in the Department of Jurisprudence at University of Sydney Law school, before joining the Faculty of Law (now Faculty of Law and Justice) in the University of New South Wales. He was appointed the Gordon Samuels Professor of Law and Social Theory in 2009.

In 1997, Krygier delivered the annual series of Australian Broadcasting Corporation Boyer Lectures on "Between Fear and Hope: Hybrid Thoughts on Public Views".

Personal
Martin Krygier born 1949 in Sydney, is the son of Richard Krygier and Roma Halpern.

Honours and awards
2002 Elected Fellow of the Academy of the Social Sciences in Australia
2002 Cavalier's Cross, Order of Merit of the Republic of Poland
2016 Dennis Leslie Mahoney Prize 
2020 Member of the Order of Australia for "significant service to legal education, and to professional associations"

References

1949 births
Living people
Members of the Order of Australia
Australian National University alumni
University of Sydney alumni
Academic staff of the University of New South Wales
Fellows of the Academy of the Social Sciences in Australia